Hoarau is a surname common in Réunion. Notable people with the surname include:

Gérard Hoarau, politician from the Seychelles
Élie Hoarau, politician representing Réunion, husband of Gélita
Gélita Hoarau, politician representing Réunion, wife of Élie
Guillaume Hoarau, footballer from Réunion
Pauline Hoarau, model from Réunion

See also
Stade Théophile Hoarau, a stadium in Réunion